Émilie Barthe (March 26, 1849 – May 10, 1930) was a Canadian most widely known for the rumours of having an intimate relationship with Prime Minister Sir Wilfrid Laurier. Her son, Armand Lavergne, is thought to be their illegitimate offspring. Later into her life she would become a Catholic nun.

Early life
Émilie Barthe was the daughter of Joseph-Guillaume Barthe, a lawyer, journalist and political figure in Canada East, and Louise-Adélaïde Pacaud, the sister of Édouard-Louis Pacaud.

Marriage and children
In 1876, Barthe married Joseph Lavergne, a Quebec lawyer, judge, editor and political figure. Barthe would change her last name to Lavergne. Their first child was born in 1877, Gabrielle. In 1880, they had a son Armand Lavergne, who would become a lawyer, journalist and political figure, serving in the House of Commons and the Legislative Assembly of Quebec.

Relationship with Wilfrid Laurier
Beginning in 1878, Laurier had an "ambiguous relationship" with the then married Émilie Barthe. Despite being married to Zoé Lafontaine, he maintained his relationship to Barthe as she relished literature and politics just as he did, while Lady Laurier was not an intellectual.

The two corresponded with letters. Towards the end of her life she gave 41 of Laurier's letters to her nephew. Among those letters was this passage from August 23, 1891:

Since Laurier became the seventh Prime Minister of Canada on July 11, 1896, he could not resume his affair with her. It was by his decision that on August 4, 1897, Joseph Lavergne, who been a Member of Parliament, was made a judge of the Superior Court for the district of Ottawa. This appointment encouraged the  family to move to Ottawa, where Barthe and Laurier could continue their relations.

Sir Wilfrid Laurier began to realize the potential damage of the rumours, he returned Barthe's letters to her and in 1901, he positioned Joseph Lavergne from Ottawa to Montreal. He limited his communication by sending his regards to her through her husband and children.

Armand Renaud Lavergne is widely thought to be the illegitimate son between Émilie Barthe and Sir Wilfrid Laurier. When Renaud Lavergne was younger he bore an uncanny facial resemblance to Laurier.

Later life
In 1922, her husband, Joseph Lavergne died. On October 15, 1924, at the age of 75, Émilie joined the Grey Nuns as a recluse.

The loss of her eldest child and only daughter, Gabrielle, in 1928, sent Barthe into a depression.

Barthe would eventually die on May 10, 1930. She was buried in Arthabaska.

References

External links
http://www.collectionscanada.gc.ca/primeministers/h4-2315-e.html
http://www.umanitoba.ca/cm/cmarchive/vol18no3/dearestemilie.html
http://www.lanouvelle.net/Actualites/Politique/2008-10-14/article-1331921/Wilfrid-Laurier-et-Emilie-Barthe%26hellip%3B-ce-que-le-juge-Cliche-en-a-dit/1

1849 births
1930 deaths
20th-century Canadian nuns
People from Montreal
19th-century Canadian women